Vinnufossen or Vinnufallet is the tallest waterfall in Europe and the seventh-tallest in the world. The falls are part of the river Vinnu which flows down from the Vinnufjellet mountain and it is fed from the Vinnufonna glacier. The falls flow into the river Driva near the village of Hoelsand.

See also
List of waterfalls by height

References

External links

Sunndal
Cascade waterfalls
Waterfalls of Møre og Romsdal